The birch shield bug (Elasmostethus interstinctus) is species of shield bug in the Acanthosomatidae family. Shield bugs are often called "stink bugs" because they excrete a foul smelling liquid that is used to deter predators.

Distribution
This rather common species has an holarctic range. It is widely distributed across Europe,  Northern Asia (excluding China) and in North America.

Habitat
These shield bugs mainly inhabit sunny areas with mixed birch woodlands, deciduous trees and shrubs.

Description
These shield bugs have a relatively flat body with  the entire upper surface covered with mostly black punctures. The dorsal side is a bright yellow-green, with various red markings. In particular, pronotum is yellow-green, scutellum is green with a red center, clavus and corium are intensely red and the apex of the elytra are also bright red. The ventral side and the  abdominal margins are yellow. Legs are yellow-green.

This species of shield bug can be confused with the Hawthorn Shield Bug (Acanthosoma haemorrhoidale), which is larger and more elongate and has a smaller lateral extensions of the pronotum.

Biology
The species overwinters in an adult stage in leaf litter, after which they emerge in the spring and start to mate. From early June to the middle August eggs are laid on the upper side of leaves of and on the catkins of birch, where the nymphs feed in aggregation. Their larvae feed usually on birch, but could also be found on aspen and hazel. They have also been found feeding on various other host plants, mainly on juniper, Quercus, Ilex, Vaccinium, Alnus, Fagus and Populus species. The new generation is complete by August.

Bibliography
Henry, Thomas J., and Richard C. Froeschner, eds. (1988), Catalog of the Heteroptera, or True Bugs, of Canada and the Continental United States
Thomas, Donald B. (1991) The Acanthosomatidae (Heteroptera) of North America, The Pan-Pacific Entomologist, vol. 67, no. 3
Ekkehard Wachmann: Wanzen beobachten - kennenlernen. J. Neumann - Neudamm, Melsungen 1989, .

Gallery

References

External links
 Nature Spot

Acanthosomatidae
Hemiptera of Europe
Bugs described in 1758
Taxa named by Carl Linnaeus